The 1953 Troy State Red Wave football team represented Troy State Teachers College (now known as Troy University) as a member of the Alabama Intercollegiate Conference (AIC) during the 1953 college football season. Led by third-year head coach Jim Grantham, the Red Wave compiled an overall record of 3–5, with a mark of 2–1 in conference play.

Schedule

References

Troy State
Troy Trojans football seasons
Troy State Red Wave football